Robert Jay Walsh (August 1, 1854 – December 7, 1916) was Secretary of the State of Connecticut from 1889 to 1893, and a member of the Connecticut Senate representing the 12th District from 1885 to 1888. He also served as President pro tempore of the Connecticut Senate.

He was born August 1, 1854, in Lewisboro, New York, the son of James F. and Annie E. Walsh. At the age of ten, he moved to Ridgefield, Connecticut where he attended High Ridge Institute. At the age of fourteen he became an apprentice in a blacksmith shop. After his apprenticeship, he became a teacher. He enrolled in the Normal School at New Britain.

In 1877, he began studying law in the office of Huested W. R. Hoyt, in Greenwich. In 1880,  Walsh was admitted to the Fairfield County bar. In 1882, he opened his own law office in Greenwich.

He campaigned for Garfield in 1880. In the same year, he began his service on the Connecticut Republican Central Committee.

In 1882, he was appointed corporation counsel of the town and borough of Greenwich.

In 1884, he was elected to the Connecticut Senate. In 1886, he was re-elected by a wider margin. In 1886 and 1887 he was President Pro Tempore of the Senate.

He was appointed judge of the Criminal Branch of the Court of Common Pleas, but resigned in 1900 to continue his law practice, business and political pursuits.

He was an alternate delegate to the Republican National Convention from Connecticut in 1900.

He died at his home in Greenwich in December 7, 1916.

Associations 
 President, Greenwich Trust Company
 President, Greenwich Water Company
 President, Putnam Cemetery Association
 President, Abendroth Bros. Foundry of Port Chester, N. Y.
 President, Port Chester Water Works
 Director, New York & Stamford St. R. R
 Trustee, Y. M. C. A.
 Trustee, Greenwich Library Association
 Charter member, Fairfield County Golf Club (later the Greenwich Country Club)
 Member, Blind Brook Club
 Member, Indian Harbor Yacht Club
 Member, Republican Club of New York
 Member, Acacia Lodge, F. & A. M. of Greenwich
 Member, Empire Lodge, I. O. O. F. of Greenwich

References

 
 The Guide to Nature, Volume 10

1854 births
1916 deaths
American blacksmiths
American Freemasons
Connecticut lawyers
Connecticut state court judges
Republican Party Connecticut state senators
People from Greenwich, Connecticut
People from Ridgefield, Connecticut
People from Lewisboro, New York
Secretaries of the State of Connecticut
Presidents pro tempore of the Connecticut Senate
19th-century American judges
19th-century American lawyers